Duncan Charles Baker (born 15 November 1979) is a British Conservative Party politician, who has served as the Member of Parliament (MP) for North Norfolk since the  2019 general election.

Early life and career

Baker was born in November 1979 in Norfolk, and educated at Gresham's School, a private school in Holt. He studied business at Nottingham Trent University, then qualified as a chartered accountant, and worked as a finance director.

Political career
His career in politics began with election to Holt Town Council in 2009, where he later served as Mayor.

Baker was elected to North Norfolk District Council (NNDC) in 2015, standing for UKIP in the Holt ward, which had previously been his father Michael's seat.

He became Conservative group leader in North Norfolk in May 2019. On election as an MP, he stood down from this position and was replaced by Christopher Cushing as group leader. However, he continues to serve as a district councillor.

He was elected Member of Parliament for North Norfolk in December 2019, standing as a Conservative. The constituency saw the largest decrease in the Liberal Democrat vote share at the 2019 general election, and the third highest increase in vote share for the Conservatives. The long-time incumbent, Liberal Democrat Norman Lamb, stood down after having been the MP for North Norfolk since 2001. The swing to the Conservatives was 17.5%.

Baker's record in the Parliamentary Register of members Interests shows that he has received indirect financial support from Thomas Coke, 8th Earl of Leicester, whose Holkham Hall is in the North Norfolk constituency, and from the Stalbury Trustees associated with Robert Gascoyne-Cecil, 7th Marquess of Salisbury.

Baker was appointed as Parliamentary Private Secretary to the Department for Levelling Up, Housing and Communities in February 2022. He resigned on 6 July 2022, in protest at Boris Johnson's conduct in the Chris Pincher scandal.

Personal life
He lives in North Norfolk and is married with two daughters.

References

External links

1979 births
Living people
UK MPs 2019–present
Conservative Party (UK) MPs for English constituencies
Alumni of Nottingham Trent University
People educated at Gresham's School
UK Independence Party councillors
Conservative Party (UK) councillors
British accountants
People from Holt, Norfolk